Mswati III (born Makhosetive; 19 April 1968) is the king (Swazi: Ngwenyama, Ingwenyama yemaSwati) of Eswatini and head of the Swazi royal family. He was born in Manzini in the Protectorate of Swaziland to King Sobhuza II and one of his younger wives, Ntfombi Tfwala. He was crowned as Mswati III, Ingwenyama and King of Swaziland, on 25 April 1986 at the age of 18, thus becoming the youngest ruling monarch in the world at that time. Together with his mother, Ntfombi Tfwala, now Queen Mother (Ndlovukati), he rules the country as an absolute monarch. Mswati III is known for his practice of polygamy (although at least two wives are appointed by the state) and currently has 15 wives.

Early life
Mswati III was born on 19 April 1968 at Raleigh Fitkin Memorial Hospital, Manzini, the son of Sobhuza II (who had more than 125 wives during his reign of 82 years), and the only child of Ntfombi Tfwala, also known as Inkhosikati LaTfwala, one of Sobhuza's younger wives. He was born four months before Eswatini attained independence from the United Kingdom. When he and his mother were discharged from the hospital, they went to live at one of Sobhuza's residences, Etjeni, near the Masundwini royal residence. His birth name was Makhosetive (lit. "Kings of Nations", in reference to the heads of state who visited Eswatini that year for the independence celebrations), and his half-siblings included Mantfombi, a future queen of the South African Zulus.

As a young prince, Makhosetive attended Masundwini Primary School and later Lozitha Palace School. He sat for the Swaziland Primary Certificate examination in December 1982 at Phondo Royal Residence and received First Class with merit in Mathematics and English. He developed a great interest in the royal guard, becoming the first young cadet to join the Umbutfo Swaziland Defence Force (USDF).

When King Sobhuza II died on 21 August 1982, the Great Council of State (the Liqoqo) selected the 14-year-old prince Makhosetive to be the next king. For the next four years, two wives of Sobhuza II, Queen Dzeliwe Shongwe (1982–1983) and Queen Ntfombi Tfwala (1983–1986), served as regent while he continued his education in the United Kingdom, attending Sherborne School (International College), before he was called back to ascend to the throne.

Reign

Mswati was introduced as crown prince in September 1983 and was crowned king on 25 April 1986, aged 18 years and 6 days, thus making him one of the youngest reigning monarchs of the late 20th century, before surpassed by Oyo, who was crowned leader of the Tooro kingdom when only 3 in 1995. The king and his mother, whose title is Indlovukati ("Great She-Elephant"), rule jointly.

Today King Mswati III is Africa's last absolute monarch in the sense that he has the power to choose the prime minister, other top government posts and top traditional posts. Even though he makes the appointments, he still has to get special advice from the queen mother and council, for example when he chooses the prime minister. In matters of cabinet appointments, he gets advice from the prime minister.  He ruled by decree, but did restore the nation's Parliament, which had been dissolved by his father in order to ensure concentration of power remained with the king. Parliamentarians are appointed by himself (two-thirds of the senators and ten deputies) or elected by traditional chiefs close to power.  Close to the evangelical churches, he banned divorce and the wearing of miniskirts.

In 2006, Mswati promulgated a new constitution that even though it allows freedom of speech and assembly, is actually restricted in practice, as criticized by Amnesty International.

In an attempt to mitigate the HIV and AIDS pandemic in 2001, the king used his traditional powers to invoke a time-honoured chastity rite (umcwasho) under the patronage of a princess, which encouraged all Swazi maidens to abstain from sexual relations for five years. This was last done under Sobhuza II in 1971. This rite banned sexual relations for Swazis under 18 years of age from 9 September 2001 to 19 August 2005, but just two months after imposing the ban, he violated this decree when a 17-year-old liphovela (royal fiancée) was chosen, who became his 13th wife. As per custom, he was fined a cow by members of her regiment, which he duly paid.

Mswati has visited Taiwan seventeen times as of June 2018, and has promised to continue recognizing Taiwan instead of the People's Republic of China.

Eswatini is predominantly rural and is one of the poorest countries in the world (63% of its population lives below the poverty line). An economic circle of 15,000 businessmen takes most of the country's wealth. This circle includes South African investors who have come to Eswatini to find labour at one-third the cost and a group of white businessmen who are heirs to the British settlers.

In January 2021, Mswati contracted COVID-19, and later thanked Taiwan for providing antiviral medication that helped with his recovery. Mswati did not disclose that he had been hospitalized until after his recovery.

In June 2021, the 2021 Eswatini protests broke out against authoritarianism and the suppression of opposition. The Communist Party of Swaziland alleged he had fled to South Africa on the night of 28–29 June, whereas the Swaziland Solidarity Network claimed he fled to Mozambique. Both of these claims were denied by acting prime minister Themba Nhlanganiso Masuku.

Wives, concubines, and succession 

The king currently has 15 wives and 36 children. A Swazi king's first two wives are chosen for him by the national councillors. There are complex rules on succession. Traditionally the king is chosen through his mother as represented in the Swazi saying Inkhosi, yinkhosi ngenina, meaning "a king is king through his mother". According to tradition, he can marry his fiancées only after they have become pregnant, proving they can bear heirs. Until then, they are termed liphovela, or "concubines".

Controversies
Mswati's reign has brought some changes in the government and political transformation. However, critics such as the People's United Democratic Movement (PUDEMO) believe that these changes are solely aimed at strengthening and perpetuating the traditional order. His attendance at the May 2012 Sovereign Monarchs lunch, to celebrate the Diamond Jubilee of Queen Elizabeth II, caused some controversy, given criticisms of his regime's human rights record.

Eswatini has been described as having been gripped by years of fiscal indiscipline, government corruption, and lavish lifestyles of the royal family. The nation has also been described as being on the brink of economic disaster due to these factors. 

Mswati's reign has been criticized for its several alleged human rights violations.  His regime has been accused of using torture and excessive force to control the masses as well as blatant discrimination against various dissenting groups.  His regime has been accused of extrajudicial killings by his forces, along with arbitrary arrests, detentions, and unwarranted searches and seizures of homes and property.  His government has restricted freedom of speech, assembly and association, and has harassed activists and journalists. The government has reportedly targeted the LGBT community, labour leaders, and activists against child labour, among other groups.  The courts took little or no action to punish Mswati's actions or the officials who committed the abuses.

Mswati has been accused of kidnapping women he desires to marry, although no case can be brought against him.  In addition, in 2000 he allegedly called for a parliamentary meeting to debate if HIV-positive people should be "sterilized and branded".

Wealth

Mswati has been criticized for his lavish lifestyle, especially by the media; in one report he was accused of living a luxurious lifestyle while the people of his country starve. In the 2014 national budget, parliament allocated $61 million (US) for the King's annual household budget, while 63% of Swazis live on less than $1.25 per day. Mswati banned photography of his automobiles after he was criticized for purchasing luxury cars, such as a $500,000 DaimlerChrysler Maybach 62. According to the Forbes 2009 list of the World's 15 Richest Royals, King Mswati is worth a reported $200 million. In January 2004 the  Times of Swaziland reported that the king asked his government to spend about $15-million to redecorate three main palaces and build others for each of his 11 wives. The Prime Minister's Office issued a press statement saying the article in the Times of Swaziland was "reckless and untrue" and that the proposal was for the construction of 5 State Houses, not Palaces, and the cost was only €19.9 million. Later that year the go-ahead was given to build five new buildings at a cost of more than $4-million out of public funds. In August 2008, Swazi scouts marched through the capital protesting the cost of a shopping spree taken abroad by nine of the King's thirteen wives. The demonstration was organized by Positive Living, a non-governmental organization for Swazi women living with AIDS.

Mswati has a personal stake in a large portion of Eswatini's economy which is a factor in its below-average economic growth for a Sub-Saharan nation.  As an absolute monarch, he holds the power to dissolve parties, and can veto any legislation parliament passes.

LaMahlangu controversy

According to accusations by Amnesty International, Zena Mahlangu, an 18-year-old high school student, disappeared from her school in October 2002. Her mother, Lindiwe Dlamini, learned that her daughter had been taken by two men, Qethuka Sgombeni Dlamini and Tulujani Sikhondze, and she reported the matter to the police.  Some time later, she was told that her daughter was at Ludzidzini Royal Village and was being prepared to be the next wife of the king. She demanded that her daughter be returned to her custody, and threatened to sue.

Among the criteria for a liphovela (future bride) is that the girl must not be a twin; Zena Mahlangu was half of a brother-sister twin set, and therefore not eligible. The matter went to the High Court, but Swaziland's Attorney-General Phesheya Dlamini intervened.
She has since had two children, and formally became the king's wife in 2010.

Amnesty International said:

Country name change 
On 19 April 2018, King Mswati III changed the name of the country from Swaziland to Eswatini to mark its 50th anniversary of independence. The name change coincided with the king's birthday. The actual anniversary took place on 6 September, though in the same year. Eswatini is the ancient, original name for the country, chosen as a departure from its colonial past.

Honours

National 
  : Grand Master of the Royal Order of King Sobhuza II (1986).
  : Grand Master of the Royal Order of the Great She-Elephant (2002).
  : Grand Master of the Royal Order of the Crown (2002).
  : Grand Master of the Royal Family Order of Mswati III (2002).
  : Grand Master of the Military Order of Swaziland (2002).
  : Grand Master of the Order of the Elephant (2018).

Foreign 
  : Knight of the Venerable Order of St John (11 November 1991).
  : Knight Grand Cross of the Order of Good Hope (August 1995).

See also 
Without the King, 2007 documentary film featuring Mswati III and his daughter Princess Sikhanyiso.

References

Bibliography
 Ginidza, Zodwa R. (1986).  Umntfwana!: A Pictorial Biography of the New King of Swaziland. Swaziland: Macmillan Swaziland National Pub. Co.   OCLC 16874145
 Levin, Richard and Hugh MacMillan. (2003).  "Swaziland: Recent History," in  Africa South of the Sahara 2004. London: Routledge. 
 Simelane, Hamilton Sipho. (2005).  "Swaziland: Reign of Mswati III," pp. 1528-1530, in  Encyclopedia of African History, Kevin Shillington, ed.  London: CRC Press.

External links

Archived copy of "the Official Website of Swaziland Monarchy"
Swazi King's Birthday features
Swazi Royal Family Tree
BBC News: Troubled King Mswati
Swaziland king picks wife – BBC Video
King Mswati III's address to the 63rd session of the United Nations General Assembly, 25 September 2008
An Extravagant Ruler of a Modest Kingdom – New York Times Movie review
 In Destitute Kingdom, Ruler Lives Like a King
 
 

1968 births
Living people
Swazi Christians
Swazi monarchs
20th-century politicians
21st-century politicians
20th-century monarchs in Africa
21st-century monarchs in Africa
People from Manzini
Mswati III
Polygamy
Monarchies of South Africa